Shun Shibata (born 15 June 1997) is a Japanese professional footballer who plays as a midfielder for Stomil Olsztyn.

Career

In 2016, Shibata signed for German fifth division side SV Gonsenheim. Before the 2019 season, he signed for Auda in the Latvian second division. Before the second half of 2019-20, he signed for Polish fourth division club Olimpia Zambrów. In 2021, Shibata signed for Stomil Olsztyn in the Polish second division. On 21 August 2021, he debuted for Stomil Olsztyn during a 0-2 loss to Widzew Łódź.

References

External links
 
 

Living people
1997 births
Japanese footballers
Association football midfielders
Oberliga (football) players
I liga players
II liga players
III liga players
FK Auda players
OKS Stomil Olsztyn players
Olimpia Zambrów players
SV Gonsenheim players
Japanese expatriate footballers
Expatriate footballers in Germany
Expatriate footballers in Latvia
Expatriate footballers in Poland
Japanese expatriate sportspeople in Germany
Japanese expatriate sportspeople in Latvia
Japanese expatriate sportspeople in Poland